Schizomyia impatientis is a species of fly in the family Cecidomyiidae. This gall midge species induces galls on jewelweeds in eastern North America. It was first described by Carl Robert Osten-Sacken in 1862.

References

Cecidomyiinae
Articles created by Qbugbot
Insects described in 1862

Gall-inducing insects
Diptera of North America
Taxa named by Carl Robert Osten-Sacken